Spilonota semirufana is a species of moth of the  family Tortricidae. It is found in China (Tianjin, Jilin, Heilongjiang, Henan), Korea, Japan and Russia.

References

Moths described in 1882
Eucosmini